Syed Bashir Ahmad (born 2 January 1952 in Sheikhar, Pulwama district in Jammu and Kashmir) is a Kashmiri politician. He has worked for the social upliftment of people living in rural areas and has championed the cause of weaker sections. He  was the Member of Legislative Assembly from Rajpora Constituency and Chairman of Petitions Committee of the Jammu and Kashmir Legislative Assembly.

Political career
He was associated with politics from a very young age and remained associated with Janata Dal, Indian National Congress and Jan Morcha. When elections for the state assembly were held in 1996, Syed Bashir contested the elections from Pulwama constituency on a Janata Dal ticket against the National Conference candidate, but lost by a thin margin.

In 1999, he along with other leaders founded Jammu & Kashmir Peoples Democratic Party (PDP), which was then headed by the former Home Minister of India and Jammu and Kashmir Chief Minister Mufti Mohammad Sayeed. In 2002, he contested and won the Assembly Elections from Rajpora Constituency and was made a Minister for Education in the Mufti Mohammad Sayeed led Government. He later held the portfolios of 'PHE, Irrigation and Flood Control', and 'Roads & Buildings'. He again won from the same constituency in the 2008 Assembly Elections.

In July 2005, militants made a bid on the life of Syed Bashir Ahmad at crowded Budshah Chowk in Srinagar when he was on way from Civil Secretariat. He escaped unhurt but two of his personnel security officers (PSO) and a civilian were injured in the shooting incident.

In July 2014, PDP dropped the name of Syed Bashir Ahmad from its list of candidates for 2014 Assembly elections. Soon after that hundreds of his party workers from Rajpora Constituency took to streets and staged a massive protest outside Housing Colony in Pulwama which houses top politicians and legislative members. The protesters amid anti-party slogans castigated Mufti Muhammad Sayeed for ignoring Syed Bashir. These protesters later on drove their vehicles towards Srinagar and staged a protest outside PDP president’s official Gupkar residence and demanded mandate in favour of Syed Bashir. Syed Bashir later revealed that he was not taken into confidence before dropping his name from the list which had earlier included his name as the party candidate from Rajpora constituency and was just told on phone that the candidate was changed.

In October 2014, Syed Bashir was expelled from PDP. According to a statement by PDP, Syed Bashir was expelled from the party for holding anti-party activities. In an interview to press, Syed Bashir refuted those allegations and said:
″I do not know why I have been expelled. I did not receive any notice from the party stating the cause of my expulsion. I was phoned by a journalist yesterday evening that I have been expelled from the party. They should have exposed my anti-party activities. I never involved myself in any anti-party activity. I didn't speak against PDP. I respected the party symbol even when I was denied the party mandate. I am compelled to tell you that Mufti Mohammad Sayeed's stature in the party has weakened which is the reason for current turmoil in the party. If Mufti Sayeed asks the party leaders to do this or that thing ten times, it would not be given a practical shape. He has become a pawn in his own party.″ 

On 30 October 2014, Syed Bashir Ahmad announced to contest the J&K Legislative Assembly elections 2014, as an independent candidate. Addressing a press conference at his Sheikhar residence, Syed Bashir said, "Though many political parties had offered me the ticket but I declined them as my workers and supporters wanted me to contest independently. I was left with no option but to respect their aspirations and emotions."

References

1952 births
Living people
Kashmiri people
Jammu and Kashmir Peoples Democratic Party politicians
People from Pulwama district
Janata Dal politicians
Indian National Congress politicians from Jammu and Kashmir
Jammu and Kashmir MLAs 2002–2008
Jammu and Kashmir MLAs 2008–2014